Best III is the fifth compilation album by Japanese singer Akina Nakamori. It was released on 10 November 1992 through Warner Music Japan label.

Background
The album followed the earlier Best and Best II onto the album charts. It was released after Nakamori's departure from the Warner Music Japan. The album jacket is taken from the photo book Cruise released in 1989.

The compilation album contains all the singles released between 1989 and 1991: from the single "Liar" to "Futari Shizuka: Tenkawa Densetsu Satsujin Jiken yori" and all their B-sides. Aside of the singles, the album includes "Akaitori Nigeta" (an alternative take of "Meu amor é..."),  "La Bohème" (the b-side of "Desire (Jōnetsu)"), "Eki" and "Oh No, Oh Yes!" (from the album Crimson).

Promotion

Singles
Akaitori Nigeta is the special single to be released on the Nakamori's third debut anniversary. It has different name and lyrics song from "Meu amor é...". Nakamori herself refused to perform the single in the music shows, but she performed in twice: in the live tour Bitter and Sweet instead of "Meu amor é..." and NHK's music television program Young Studio. The single debuted at number 5 on the Oricon Weekly Single Charts and became the 20th best sold single in 1985. In the Best Ten ranking, it debuted on number 6 and stayed at number 45 in the yearly chart.

Dear Friend is the twenty-fourth single on 17 July 1990. It was Nakamori's first single to be released after one year of hiatus. The single debuted at number 1 on Oricon Single Weekly Chart and became the 6th best sold single in 1990.

Mizu ni Sashita Hana is the twenty-fifth single on 6 November 1990. It was promoted as a theme song to the wednesday series of the japanese television drama Wednesday Grand Romance. The single debuted at number 1 on Oricon Single Weekly Chart and became the 92nd best sold single in 1990 and 76th best sold single in 1991.

Futari Shizuka is the twenty-sixth single released on 25 March 1991. While the writes's version of the song, Makoto Sekiguchi (ex. C-C-B) was used as a theme song to the movie Tenkawa Densetsu Satsujin Jiken, Nakamori's version was used as a commercial song to the movie. The single debuted at number 3 on Oricon Single Weekly Chart and became the 21st best sold single in 1991.

Chart performance
The album debuted at number 6 on the Oricon Weekly Album Charts and charted for 7 weeks.

Track listing

References

1992 compilation albums
Akina Nakamori compilation albums
Japanese-language compilation albums
Warner Music Japan albums